Loxomorpha is a genus of moths of the family Crambidae.

Species
Loxomorpha amseli Munroe, 1995
Loxomorpha cambogialis (Guenée, 1854)
Loxomorpha flavidissimalis Grote, 1877
Loxomorpha pulchellalis (Dyar, 1922)

References

Spilomelinae
Crambidae genera
Taxa named by Hans Georg Amsel